Chrysotus neglectus is a species of fly in the family Dolichopodidae. It is found in the Palearctic.

References

External links
Ecology of Commanster 

Diaphorinae
Insects described in 1817
Asilomorph flies of Europe
Taxa named by Christian Rudolph Wilhelm Wiedemann